Marcus Jerome Bingham Jr. (born July 14, 2000) is an American basketball player. He played college basketball for the Michigan State Spartans.

High school career
Bingham stood 6 ft 2 in (1.88 m) entering high school, starting at Central High School in Grand Rapids, Michigan, where he did not play basketball. For his sophomore season, he transferred to Ottawa Hills High School in Grand Rapids and began playing basketball recreationally, though his friends suggested he take it more seriously. During his first two years of high school, Bingham did not do homework and often misbehaved, and he held a 1.3 grade point average at Ottawa Hills. Concerned about his future, his mother had him move to Catholic Central High School in Grand Rapids, a school with superior academics, attending on probation and ultimately improving his grades. As a senior, Bingham averaged 21 points, 11 rebounds, four blocks and two assists per game. He was a finalist for Mr. Basketball of Michigan and was named Grand Rapids Press Player of the Year. A consensus four-star recruit, he committed to playing college basketball for Michigan State over offers from Butler, Pittsburgh, Purdue, VCU and Xavier.

College career
Bingham had a limited role in his freshman season at Michigan State, playing 83 minutes. As a sophomore, he averaged 3.5 points, 3.6 rebounds and 1.4 blocks per game. In his junior season, Bingham averaged 3.5 points, 3.2 rebounds and 1.4 blocks per game. He improved his ballhandling and shooting skills over the summer, and grew one inch to 7 ft 0. He became a regular starter as a senior and had breakout success. On November 24, 2021, Bingham posted 11 points, nine rebounds and seven blocks, and made a game-winning dunk, in a 63–61 win against Loyola (Illinois) at the Battle 4 Atlantis first round. As a senior, he averaged 9.3 points, 6.3 rebounds and 2.2 blocks per game.

Professional career
In September 2022, he was signed by the Dallas Mavericks, but waived on October 13.

Career statistics

College

|-
| style="text-align:left;"| 2018–19
| style="text-align:left;"| Michigan State
| 23 || 0 || 3.6 || .286 || .429 || .556 || 1.1 || .3 || .0 || .4 || 1.0
|-
| style="text-align:left;"| 2019–20
| style="text-align:left;"| Michigan State
| 31 || 16 || 11.1 || .400 || .179 || .634 || 3.6 || .4 || .2 || 1.4 || 3.5
|-
| style="text-align:left;"| 2020–21
| style="text-align:left;"| Michigan State
| 28 || 5 || 11.5 || .500 || .000 || .738 || 3.2 || .3 || .6 || 1.4 || 3.5
|-
| style="text-align:left;"| 2021–22
| style="text-align:left;"| Michigan State
| 35 || 32 || 18.7 || .534 || .415 || .747 || 6.3 || .3 || .9 || 2.2 || 9.3
|- class="sortbottom"
| style="text-align:center;" colspan="2"| Career
| 117 || 53 || 12.0 || .486 || .326 || .707 || 3.8 || .3 || .5 || 1.4 || 4.7

Personal life
Bingham's younger brother, Mykel, plays college basketball for Ferris State.

References

External links
Michigan State Spartans bio

2000 births
Living people
American men's basketball players
Basketball players from Grand Rapids, Michigan
Michigan State Spartans men's basketball players
Power forwards (basketball)